Rebelión de los Juniors (Spanish for "The Junior Rebellion") is a major professional wrestling show held by the Mexican Lucha Libre promotion International Wrestling Revolution Group (IWRG) annually since its creation in 2011. The focal point of the show is always a multi-man elimination match either for the IWRG Junior de Juniors Championship or for the rights to challenge the championship at a later date. All participants in the main event match are supposed to be at least a second-generation wrestler. The Junior de Juniors Championship was won by Trauma I on the 2011 Rebelión de los Juniors show, all other shows have been for the #1 Contendership. IWRG has not announced a date for the 2016 Rebelión de los Juniors show yet.

Event history
It has been a long-standing tradition in Lucha libre that family follows in the footstep of wrestlers, with a multitude of second-generation and in some instances third-generation wrestlers active in the ring today. It is not uncommon for sons to take the ring name of their father, or a variation there of, such as the son of Santo wrestling as El Hijo del Santo, literally "The Son of Santo", or Perro Aguayo Jr., taking the ring name of his father Perro Aguayo. With a large number of Mexican wrestlers starting out as masked wrestlers where their real name and true background is not revealed it has allowed for a number of wrestlers to claim to be sons of famous wrestlers when they in actuality paid for the rights to use the name, such as Cien Caras Jr. and El Hijo de Cien Caras not being related to Cien Caras but instead paid for the privileges. Normally the "kayfabe" or storyline relationship is promoted as real until a wrestler is unmasked. With family playing such an important part of lucha libre the Mexican professional wrestling promotion International Wrestling Revolution Group (IWRG) that they hold several major events each year that plays off that family connection. IWRG regularly holds "family tournaments" such as Legado Final ("Final Legacy") or Guerra de Familias ("War of the Families").

Starting in 2011 IWRG has also regularly promoted a show called Rebelión de los Juniors ("The Junior Rebellion"), focusing specifically on second and third-generation wrestlers and normally tied to the IWRG Junior de Juniors Championship, with the main event either being for the championship or for the rights to challenge for the championship. IWRG has held a Rebelión de los Juniors five years in a row, with no specific date announced for a 2016 Rebelión de los Juniors show. A total of 87 wrestlers have participated in the five shows from 2011 through 2015 with Eterno and Golden Magic being the only wrestlers to have worked all shows so far. Golden Magic, Trauma I and Apolo Estrada Jr. have all wrestled in three Rebelión de los Juniors main events.

Dates, venues, and main events

Footnotes

References